Nannospondylus is an extinct genus of dvinosaurian temnospondyl within the family Trimerorhachidae. It is known from the Chickasha Formation in Oklahoma.

See also

 
 Prehistoric amphibian
 List of prehistoric amphibians

References

Dvinosaurs
Permian amphibians of North America
Fossil taxa described in 1965